Zengana may refer to:

 Zanganeh, a Shabak tribe
 Zəngənə, Azerbaijan
 Zengana, Iraq, in northern Iraq
 Artemisia afra, a shrub endemic to southern Africa